Bulleen Road is a 4 kilometre long road in north-eastern Melbourne, Australia serving the suburbs of Bulleen and Balwyn North, which can be seen as an alternative thoroughfare between Heidelberg and Doncaster via the Eastern Freeway.

Since the opening of EastLink the road has seen significantly larger volumes of traffic, particularly between the Eastern Freeway and Manningham Road due to the traffic between the Eastern Freeway and the Metropolitan Ring Road.

Route
Bulleen Road starts at the intersection with Templestowe Road and Bridge Street in Bulleen and runs south as a four-lane, single-carriageway road, nearly immediately crossing Manningham Road, eventually widening to a four-lane, dual-carriageway road a short distance south. It continues south until reaching the interchange with Thompsons Road and the Eastern Freeway, before narrowing backing to a four-lane, single-carriageway road and ending at the intersection with Doncaster Road in Balwyn North.

Marcellin College is located on the road in Bulleen. The Bulleen section is also subject to flooding on extremely wet days.

History
Bulleen Road was signed as Metropolitan Route 42 between Thompsons and Doncaster Roads through Balwyn North in 1965; its northern half between Templestowe and Thompsons Roads through Bulleen was signed Metropolitan Route 52 in 1989.

The passing of the Road Management Act 2004 granted the responsibility of overall management and development of Victoria's major arterial roads to VicRoads: in 2004, VicRoads re-declared the road as Bulleen Highway (Arterial #6320), beginning at Manningham Road at Bulleen and ending at the Eastern Freeway in Balwyn North, while re-declaring the remnants between Bulleen and Balwyn North as Bulleen Road (Arterial #5363). The road is still presently known (and signposted) as Bulleen Road along its entire length.

Major intersections

See also 

 List of Melbourne highways

References 

Highways and freeways in Melbourne
Transport in the City of Manningham
Transport in the City of Boroondara